Katona Nándor or Nathan Ferdinand Kleinberger (12 September 1864 Szepesófalu (Spišská Stará Ves), Kingdom of Hungary now Slovakia – 1 August 1932, Budapest, Hungary) was a Hungarian Jewish painter.

One of seven children of a dismally poor Jewish family he was discovered as a prodigy, brought up and instructed in painting by László Mednyánszky. He later studied in Budapest and Paris, and traveled extensively throughout Western Europe.

Most of his works depict scenes of nature from his home region, the Szepes county (Spiš) in particular views of the Tatra Mountains and the area of Késmárk (Kežmarok), which he considered his home town despite having spent much of his life in Budapest.

His works are on exhibit at the Hungarian National Gallery in Budapest, the Slovak National Gallery, the Eastern Slovak Gallery in Kassa (Košice) and the Tatra Gallery in Poprad.

References

Further reading 
 Anna Ondrušeková Ferdinand Katona 1864–1932 publ. Tatranská Galéria, Poprad, 2004.
 Biography in Magyar Életrajzi Lexikon

External links 
 Works of art held in Slovak art collections

 

1864 births
1932 deaths
People from Spišská Stará Ves
Jewish painters
19th-century Hungarian painters
20th-century Hungarian painters